Doncaster North is a constituency in South Yorkshire, England, represented in the House of Commons of the UK Parliament since 2005 by Ed Miliband of the Labour Party. From 2010 until 2015, he was Leader of the Opposition before he lost the 2015 general election to David Cameron and the Conservatives. Part of the red wall, it was formerly a Labour stronghold, until the 2019 general election when it became a Labour-Conservative marginal.

History 
The constituency was created in 1983 from parts of the former constituencies of Don Valley, Doncaster,  Goole, and was a Labour stronghold until the 2019 general election, when Labour held the seat with a significantly reduced majority of 2,370 votes. Ed Miliband has served as the MP for the constituency since 2005, and he also served as Leader of the Labour Party and Leader of the Opposition from 2010 until stepping down after the 2015 general election.

Boundaries 

1983–1997: The Metropolitan Borough of Doncaster wards of Adwick, Askern, Bentley Central, Bentley North Road, Hatfield, Stainforth, and Thorne.

1997–2010: The Metropolitan Borough of Doncaster wards of Adwick, Askern, Bentley Central, Bentley North Road, Stainforth, and Thorne.

2010–present: The Metropolitan Borough of Doncaster wards of Adwick, Askern Spa, Bentley, Great North Road, Mexborough, Sprotbrough, Stainforth and Moorends.

Constituency profile 
The constituency covers largely rural areas north and west of Doncaster, and suburban areas too, stretching to partly suburban Mexborough in the west, Bentley that lies on the northern banks of the River Don and Adwick which is farther north. The seat is an area with moderate typical incomes which has yet to fully recover from the almost total end of the local coal mining industry; however, large numbers of constituents now work in construction and manufacturing. Alongside these typically Labour-supporting areas, the constituency also contains  more Conservative-leaning areas such as Sprotbrough.

Doncaster North has returned Labour MPs since 1983, when the constituency was created. The preceding constituencies had returned Labour MPs at every general election since at least 1935.

At the EU referendum held on 23 June 2016, Doncaster voted to leave the European Union. This was a contrast to the views of the constituency's MP Ed Miliband, who advocated a "Remain" vote. Miliband was re-elected on 12 December with a significantly reduced majority of 2,370 votes at the 2019 general election, which is attributed to Brexit Party candidate Andy Stewart picking up 8,294 votes and finishing in third place with 20.4% of the vote. Following the collapse in the Labour vote, the seat is now marginal between Labour and the Conservatives.

Members of Parliament

Elections

Elections in the 2010s

Elections in the 2000s

Elections in the 1990s

Elections in the 1980s

See also 
 List of parliamentary constituencies in South Yorkshire

Notes

References

Sources 
Ed Miliband, MP for Doncaster North The website of Ed Miliband

Parliamentary constituencies in Yorkshire and the Humber
Politics of Doncaster
Constituencies of the Parliament of the United Kingdom established in 1983